Ullberg is a surname. Notable people with this surname include:

 Irène K:son Ullberg (1930–2022), Swedish painter
 Richard Ullberg (born 1993), Finnish ice hockey player
 Uno Ullberg (1879–1944), Finnish architect